{{DISPLAYTITLE:C10H13N3O2}}
The molecular formula C10H13N3O2 (molar mass: 207.23 g/mol, exact mass: 207.1008 u) may refer to:

 Guanoxan
 NNK (nicotine-derived nitrosamine ketone)